The 2014–15 Metal Ligaen season is the 58th season of ice hockey in Denmark. Ten teams participated in the league. The regular season began on 19 September 2014 and ended on 22 February 2015. The league championship was won by SønderjyskE.

Regular season

Playoffs
.

External links
 Metal Ligaen official website

Dan
2014 in Danish sport
2015 in Danish sport
Seasons in Superisligaen